A Sand Book is a poetry collection published in 2019 by poet and writer Ariana Reines. It received positive reviews. Writing in The New Yorker, Hannah Aizenman referred to the collection as "[...] a psychedelic epic about climate change and forever war; capitalism and surveillance; gun violence and police brutality; fascism and genocide; diaspora, mental illness, gender, and the occult."

Reines won the 2020 Kingsley Tufts Poetry Award for the book.

References

2019 poetry books
American poetry collections
Tin House books